Murder Being Once Done is a novel by British crime-writer Ruth Rendell, first published in 1972. It is the seventh entry in her popular Inspector Wexford series.

1972 British novels
Novels by Ruth Rendell
Novels set in London
Hutchinson (publisher) books
Inspector Wexford series